Bukkuyum (or Bukwium)) is a Local Government Area in Zamfara State, Nigeria. Its headquarters are in the town of Bukkuyum. In March 2017 more than 300 children died of lead poisoning from illegal mining site at yar Galma village at in the north-west of the area.

It has an area of 3,214 km and a population of 211,633 at the 2006 census.

The postal code of the area is 891.

References

Local Government Areas in Zamfara State